, also known as MRO, is a Japanese broadcast network affiliated with the Japan News Network (JNN). Their headquarters is located in Ishikawa Prefecture.

The "MRO" abbreviation is taken from the last letters of the call signs "JOMR" and "JOMO" of the Kanazawa and Nanao broadcasting stations, respectively. JOMO is no longer operational.

MRO functions as the default Japan News Network affiliate for the Fukui Prefecture, as that area doesn't have a JNN affiliate of its own.

Network 
 TV: Japan News Network (JNN)
 RADIO: Japan Radio Network (JRN), National Radio Network (NRN)

History

Early history 
On December 24, 1948, the Ishikawa Prefectural government applied for a license to operate a commercial broadcaster under the name Hokuriku Cultural Broadcasting, and was the fourth Japanese company to apply to operate a commercial broadcaster. This application was later rejected due to Supreme Commander for the Allied Powers' media censorship.

After the establishment of the "Three Radio Laws" (Radio Law, Broadcasting Law, and Radio Supervisory Committee Establishment Law) in 1950, multiple license to operate a commercial broadcasting applications appear in various parts of Japan. The local newspaper Hokkoku Shimbun in Ishikawa Prefecture revived its plans to operate a new broadcaster.On February 10, 1951, Hokkoku Shimbun took the lead and the founders meeting were held.In April 21 of the same year, the Ministry of Posts granted 16 of the broadcast licenses and Hokuriku Cultural Broadcasting was listed. However, the broadcast area is limited to Ishikawa Prefecture, and does not include Toyama and Fukui prefectures, which are within the scope of the application.

Start as radio broadcaster 
Two test radio broadcasts were launched: on April 22, 1952 at 9amand on May 1 of the same year.At 6am on May 10, 1952, Hokuriku Cultural Broadcasting was officially launched, becoming the first commercial radio broadcaster along the Sea of Japan.The broadcaster was initially located in the 4th floor of the Marukoshi Department store in Kanazawa City.

Station list

Analog Television 
 Kanazawa JOMR-TV 6ch
 Wajima 10ch
 Nanao 11ch
 Suzu 6ch
 Monzen 11ch
 Yamanaka 12ch
 Machino 6ch
 Yanagida 12ch
 Noto 6ch
 Hakui 50ch
 Togi 5ch

Digital Television(ID:6) 
 Kanazawa 14ch
 Nanao 20ch

RADIO 
 Kanazawa JOMR 1107 kHz; 94.0 MHz FM
 Nanao 1107 kHz; 88.6 MHz FM
 Wajima 1107 kHz; 77.1 MHz FM
 Yamanaka 1485 kHz

Program 
 TV
 Reosta（レオスタ）
 Zekkocho W（絶好調W）etc ... 
 RADIO
 Oine Doine（おいね★どいね）
 Twin Wave（ツインウェーブ） etc ...

Rival Stations 
Ishikawa TV(ITC)
TVkanazawa(KTK)
Hokuriku Asahi Broadcasting(HAB)

References

External links
 MRO WEB (MRO Official Homepage)

Ishikawa Prefecture
Japan News Network
Television stations in Japan
Radio in Japan
Radio stations established in 1952
Television channels and stations established in 1958
Mass media in Kanazawa, Ishikawa
Japanese companies established in 1952